Pannonia Allstars Ska Orchestra are a Hungarian ska band formed in Budapest, in 2003. The band's musical style has fused Jamaican-style ska and reggae with jazz melodies and elements of traditional Hungarian folk music.

After their first demo in 2003 they have released four studio albums on Megalith Records and one live album on Crossroads Records. The band have toured extensively around Continental Europe and regularly play the Sziget Festival, where they played on the main stage in 2008.

The band members also run several side projects, such as PASO Soundsystem (ska DJ set) and PASO's Roots Rockers (dub and reggae live band set). They also present a weekly ska radio show on the Hungarian Tilos Rádió station.

The band also started PASO Booking, a gig booking agency with an aim to bring more ska music to Hungary. As well as their local events, they have so far brought acts such as The Toasters, Bad Manners, The Slackers, New York Ska-Jazz Ensemble, and The Aggrolites to the region. They also use this agency to put on a yearly ska camp called Big Skaland Skanking Camping.

Lead vocalist Kristóf Tóth, more commonly known by the stage name KRSA, performs alongside many other Hungarian bands including Irie Maffia and the Budapest Riddim Band. KRSA and the Pannonia Allstars Ska Orchestra brass section have also played with a host of British musicians, including Sam Duckworth, Drew McConnell and Jimmy Pursey for Love Music Hate Racism. Kristóf Tóth is also referred to as Lord Panamo, due to wearing a Panama hat (as well as his trademark white suit) on stage and as a homage to ska artist Lord Tanamo.

Band members
Kristóf Tóth aka Lord Panamo/KRSA – vocals
Aron Koós-Hutás – trumpet
László Vajay aka Mr. Vajay – trombone
Gábor Lukács aka Baba Luki – saxophone
Tamás Meleg aka Tommy Hot – saxophone
Dávid Benkő aka Mr. P – keyboards
László Nagy aka Lacibá – guitar
Zoltán Csáki aka Csakikapitany – guitar
Vince Pozsgai aka Dr. Strict – bass
László Rácz aka Lipi Brown – drums
György Barna aka G. Brown – violin

Past members
Gábor Subicz aka Tony Ass – trumpet
Ádám Ignácz – keyboards

Discography

Studio albums

Live albums

DVD

Remix album

EPs

Singles

See also
Irie Maffia
The Toasters
King Django
Rotterdam Ska-Jazz Foundation

References

External links
 
 PASO's Roots Rockers
 Ska Club on Tilos Rádió
 
 

Hungarian ska groups